The 2018–19 season was İstanbul Başakşehir's fifth consecutive season in the Süper Lig and their 29th year in existence.

Season summary
Başakşehir sat at the top of the Süper Lig table for most of the season and the club looked to be on their way to clinching their first major trophy before losing out to city rivals Galatasaray following defeat to the same club in May 2020. Playmaker Edin Višća was named the Süper Lig player of the season at the end of season awards ceremony.

Squad

U21 players
Only professional players and/or players with first team numbers are listed.

Out on loan

Other players under contract

Competitions

Süper Lig

League table

Positions by round
The following table represents Başakşehir's positions after each round in the competition.

Matches

Turkish Cup

Fourth round

Başakşehir won 3–1 on aggregate.

Round of 16

Hatayspor won 4–2 on aggregate.

Europa League

Third qualifying round

Burnley won 1–0 on aggregate.

References

External links

İstanbul Başakşehir F.K. seasons
İstanbul Başakşehir F.K.
İstanbul Başakşehir F.K.